The  2018 Beijing Sinobo Guoan F.C. season  was their 15th consecutive season in the Chinese Super League, established in the 2004, and 28th consecutive season in the top flight of Chinese football. They competed in the Chinese Super League and Chinese FA Cup.

First team
As of 13 July 2018

Transfers

Winter

In:

Out:

Summer

In:

Out:

Staff

|}

Friendlies

Pre-season

Mid–season

Competitions

Chinese Super League

Table

Results by round

Matches

Chinese FA Cup

References

Beijing Guoan F.C. seasons
Chinese football clubs 2018 season